Bjordal is a village in Høyanger Municipality in Vestland county, Norway. The village is located along the Fuglsetfjorden, an arm that branches off the main Sognefjorden to the north. Norwegian County Road 92 runs through Bjordal, connecting it to Ortnevik to the northeast and to the village of Matre in Masfjorden municipality to the southwest.

Bjordal is situated in a small valley surrounded by steep mountains on three sides and the fjord and on the north end of the valley. Bjordal Church is located in the village, serving the southwest part of the municipality. The largest industry in the area is agriculture. There is also a rock quarry which exports stone elsewhere in the country.

References 

Villages in Vestland
Høyanger